College is a St. Louis MetroLink station. This station serves Southwestern Illinois College and the Green Mount Commons shopping center near the eastern edge of Belleville, Illinois. It is also a large commuter station featuring 598 park and ride spaces and 25 long-term spaces.

College station has a connection to the St. Clair County Transit District's 14 mile (22.5 km) MetroBikeLink shared-use path system. This was the first segment of the MetroBikeLink system when it opened in 2002 and consisted of a 4 mile (6.4 km) trail, running from the Swansea station to Southwestern Illinois College. Here, trail users can connect with pathways on the college campus and the East Belleville YMCA Loop Trail just north of Illinois Route 161 (Carlyle Avenue).

Station layout

References

External links 
 St. Louis Metro

St. Clair County Transit District
MetroLink stations in St. Clair County, Illinois
College station
Railway stations in the United States opened in 2001
Red Line (St. Louis MetroLink)
Railway stations in Illinois at university and college campuses